This is a list of episodes for the British Channel 4 comedy Balls of Steel. Overall three series have aired between 19 August 2005 and 25 April 2008.

Series 1 (2005)

Series 2 (2007)

Series 3 (2008)

Notes

Lists of British comedy television series episodes
Lists of British LGBT-related television series episodes